Piloto automático is the third studio album by Cuban singer-songwriter Diego Gutiérrez. Like Gutiérrez's previous works, it shows great variety and generic versatility, ranging from pop-rock to Latin American music, with a mixture and fusion of Cuban music, Trova and folk music.

Production 
This album was recorded at Abdala Studios (Havana, Cuba), with a record production based on the arrangements of Emilio Martiní and a variable format of musicians, chosen according to the generic variety of the album. Piloto automático represented a return to reflexive and nostalgic songs, although there are some with a more optimistic air and spirit.

Track listing

Personnel 

Vocals, acoustic guitar and backing vocals: Diego Gutiérrez

Electric guitar, acoustic guitar and backing vocals: Emilio Martiní

Keyboards and programming: Emilio Martiní

Electric bass track 1: Jan Cruz

Double bass on track 6: Gastón Joya

Electric bass and double bass on the other tracks: David Faya

Drums: Otto Santana

Acoustic piano on tracks 4, 5 and 6: Miguel Ángel de Armas

Minor percussion and miscellaneous: Yosvany Betancourt

Saxophone on track 6: Jamil Scherry

Violin on track 8: Jelien Baso

Quena on track 5: Rodrigo Sosa

Backing vocals on tracks 1, 2, 4 and 5: Merlin Lorenzo, Rubiel Martin and Elisabeth Padrón

Second vocals on tracks 1, 3, 5, 7 and 9

Guest artist in La casa se vuelve contra mí: David Torrens

Samples on track 3: ̈The Beatles ́ ́Lucy in the sky with diamonds ̈ ̈

Record producer: Emilio Martiní and Diego Gutiérrez

Executive Producer: Brenda Besada

Recording: Eng. Daelsis Pena

Post-Production: Eng. Merlin Lorenzo

Mixing: Eng. Jose Raúl Varona

Mastering: Eng. Orestes Águila

Photos: Alejandro Azcuy

Album art: Juan Carlos Viera

References

External links 

 Piloto automático on Discogs
 Piloto automático on Rate Your Music

2019 albums
Spanish-language albums